The Southworth House at 1108 Mississippi Ave. in Greenwood, Mississippi was built in 1922.  It was a work of local architect Frank R. McGeoy.  It was listed on the National Register of Historic Places (NRHP) in 1985.

The house, at time of its NRHP listing, was well preserved:  its integrity "is outstanding and includes such unusual survivals as
the original wooden benches that flank the entrance doorway."

References

Houses on the National Register of Historic Places in Mississippi
Houses completed in 1922
Houses in Leflore County, Mississippi
National Register of Historic Places in Leflore County, Mississippi